Johannes Heil (born 3 February 1978) is a German electronic music producer from Ober-Mörlen near Frankfurt, who has released on Cocoon Recordings (including contributing a track to their 'Cocoon Compilation F' release).

Discography 
Albums released on CD

1998	Reality to MIDI			(Kanzleramt)
1998	Per Disciplinum Mea Lux Videbis	(Uturn)
1999	Illuminate the Planet		(Kanzleramt)
2001	Future Primitive			(Kanzleramt)
2002	Heilstyle				(Kanzleramt)
2003	20,000 Leagues Under the Skin	(Kanzleramt)
2004	The World				(Datapunk Recordings)
2004	Paranoid Dancer Remixed		(Kanzleramt)
2006	Freaks R Us Part 1			(Klang Electronik)
2007 Freaks R Us Part 2 (Klang Electronik)
2007 The Coming EP (Metatron)
2008 Faith (Metatron)
2008 Aum (Metatron House Division)
2009 Sungod (Shit Happens)
2010 Loving (Cocoon)
2015 The Black Light (Exile)
2017 Gospel (Odd Even)

External links 
 Johannes Heil at Discogs

1978 births
Living people
German record producers